US 281 Bridge at the Brazos River refers to two bridges located south of Mineral Wells, Texas. They carry U.S. Route 281 (US 281) across the Brazos River.

The original bridge built in 1939 was added to the National Register on October 10, 1996. In 2016, the Texas Department of Transportation constructed a second bridge east of the original bridge. The new bridge was used to carry traffic in both directions while rehabilitation was carried out on the original bridge. After the rehabilitation, the original bridge was reopened to southbound traffic, with the new bridge solely carrying northbound traffic.

See also

National Register of Historic Places listings in Palo Pinto County, Texas
List of bridges on the National Register of Historic Places in Texas

References

External links

US 281 over BRAZOS RIVER (Ugly Bridges.com)
Brazos River Bridge (Bridgehunter.com)

Buildings and structures in Palo Pinto County, Texas
Bridges completed in 1939
U.S. Route 281
Bridges of the United States Numbered Highway System
Road bridges on the National Register of Historic Places in Texas
National Register of Historic Places in Palo Pinto County, Texas
Metal bridges in the United States